Ring 3 may refer to:

 Ring III, a road in Helsinki region, Finland
 Ring 3 (Oslo), a road Norway
 Ring 3 (computer security)

See also
 Three-ring (disambiguation)
 Third Ring Road (disambiguation)
 Ring Ring Ring (disambiguation)
 Ring (disambiguation)
 Loop (novel), the third Ring novel
 Rings (2017 film), third film in the American-remake Ring film series
 Ring 0: Birthday, third film in the Japanese Ring film series